The 1918–19 Austrian First Class season was the eighth season of top-tier football in Austria. It was won by SK Rapid Wien by seven points over SC Rudolfshügel.

League standings

Results

References
Austria - List of final tables (RSSSF)

Austrian Football Bundesliga seasons
Austria
1918–19 in Austrian football